George Pollard may refer to:

George Pollard (bowls) (1874–1963), New Zealand lawn bowls player
George Pollard (painter) (1920–2008), American portrait painter
George Pollard (politician) (1864–1937), British physician and politician
George Pollard Jr. (1791–1882), captain of the whaleship Essex
George Arthur Pollard (1863–1939), New Zealand salvation army officer and administrator